George W. Gardenhire (Oct. 4, 1841 - Dec. 19, 1905) was the first President of the Senate in the Oklahoma Territorial Legislature and a member of the Oklahoma's People's Party.

Early life
Born in 1841 in Marion County, Tennessee, Gardenhire moved to Lawrence County, Arkansas with his family when he was 10.

Gardenhire served in the Civil War for several years and returned to Arkansas where he married Rebecca James in 1866. He moved to Cowley County, Kansas in 1869. He moved to Payne County, Oklahoma in 1889.

Political career
Gardenhire is best known for pushing through a compromise bill that set up what would become Oklahoma State University - Stillwater.

Gardenhire was a Populist Party legislator, the only one on the council of the first Oklahoma Territorial Legislature. However, he was elected president, due to the division of the legislature among Republicans and Democrats.

Gardenhire also helped organize the Farmer's Alliance in Kansas during his time there.

References

Members of the Oklahoma Territorial Legislature
19th-century American politicians
People from Marion County, Tennessee
Oklahoma Territory officials
1841 births
Year of death unknown
People from Lawrence County, Arkansas
People from Cowley County, Kansas
People from Payne County, Oklahoma
Oklahoma Populists